The data is taken from the 2001 census, which excludes the following groups: portions of the nomadic Hindu population, Hindu refugees of the Lhotsam ethnic group from Bhutan, those of Tamil ethnic group from Sri Lanka, those from Bangladesh and Nepal, some members of this religion from Burma and Pakistan residing in India and a portion of Hindu citizens working abroad.

Statistics 

Religious demographics